Heather Dawn Graven is a lecturer in Atmospheric Physics at Imperial College London. She creates mathematical models to predict how climate change will impact the carbon cycle.

Education 
Graven earned a bachelor's degree in chemical engineering from California Institute of Technology in 2001. She won the Dean's Cup for contributions to student life. She earned a PhD from the Scripps Institution of Oceanography in 2008. Her PhD thesis, Advancing the use of radiocarbon in studies of global and regional carbon cycling with high precision measurements of 14C in CO2 from the Scripps CO2 Program, was assessed by Ralph Keeling.

Career 
Graven studies greenhouse gas emissions. In 2008 she joined ETH Zurich as a postdoctoral researcher. She returned to the Scripps Institution of Oceanography in 2011, researching variations in the amplitude of CO2 over the course of seasons. Since 2013, she has led the Carbon Cycle research group at Imperial College London.

Graven's research focuses on measuring atmospheric CO2 and CH4. The emission of greenhouse gases from fossil fuels can compromise the effectiveness of radiocarbon dating. She is also interested in the global uptake and cycling of carbon by plants, soil and the ocean. Her team use numerical models to predict the impact of climate change on the global carbon cycle. She is the project lead on several NASA funded projects, quantifying fossil and biospheric CO2 fluxes in California.

She took part in the American Association for the Advancement of Science 2017 Annual Meeting, discussing Global Climate Science Imperatives. Graven contributes regularly to the discussion of climate change in the media.

References 

Living people
American chemical engineers
Atmospheric scientists
Scripps Institution of Oceanography alumni
California Institute of Technology alumni
Academics of Imperial College London
Women atmospheric scientists
Women chemical engineers
21st-century women engineers
Year of birth missing (living people)